Ortleb is a surname. Notable people with the surname include:

Josephine Ortleb (born 1986), German politician
Rainer Ortleb (born 1944), German academic and politician